Persian music may refer to various types of the music of Persia/Iran or other Persian-speaking countries:

Persian traditional music
Persian ritual music
Persian pop music
Persian symphonic music
Persian piano music

See also
Music of Iran